Renuar is a fashion retailer in Israel that operates the fashion chain of the "Renuar" and "Twentyfourseven" brands.

This is the fifth largest fashion chain in Israel. The chain markets clothing, footwear, jewelry, bags, and fashion accessories.

History 
In 1993, the Renuar Group was founded by businessmen Eli Berkowitz and Yossi Brosh. A year later, in 1994, Serge Deri joined them, and since then he has served as Group CEO.

The Renuar Group has branches spread nationwide at the largest malls in Israel. Most of the sales points operated by the Group are sold through both its owned stores and through a franchise set.

The group has about 1,300 employees. About 300 employees at the company's headquarters and logistics center in Rishon Lezion, the other employees are employed at 95 sales points throughout Israel.

External links 

 הקמפיין לרנואר עם יהודה לוי
 Apax in advanced talks to buy 50% Renuar stake
 Renuar Renovates on the Fashion Runway

Retail companies of Israel
Clothing companies of Israel
1993 establishments in Israel